Dead Men Running (1969) is the final novel by Australian writer D'Arcy Niland. It was published posthumously.

Plot summary
Set during the years 1910 to 1916, the novel follows the story of Starkey Moore, a loner living in the small outback town of Hope, who discovers a young man collapsed by the side of a road in a storm.  Moore nurses the young Joey back to health and proceeds to teach him a number of life lessons.

Critical reception
Ian Hicks, writing in The Canberra Times, was impressed with the book: "After my first reading of Dead Men Running, I had an overwhelming feeling of disappointment that there would be nothing more from the pen of D'Arcy Niland. But look at it from another viewpoint. How fortunate a man to have died, leaving behind a book as good as this. Make no mistake, it is a statement of fact, not of opinion nor of sympathy, to assert that this is a great novel."

Notes 
 Dedication: For his friends
 The novel was initially refused transmission by post by the Postmaster-General's Department after the "department had objected to a four-letter word used by a cockatoo in the novel."  Later: "Announcing the lifting of the ban yesterday, the Postmaster-General, Mr Hulme, said that having checked on the general nature of the book, and having taken into account the types of books which have been passed by censoring authorities, the department had decided against the ban."

Television adaptation
The novel was adapted for television by the Australian Broadcasting Corporation in 1971.  Shown over 6 episodes the adaptation was directed by Eric Taylor, from a script by Harold Lander and Eric Taylor, and featured Ewen Solon, Brendon Lunney, and Diane Craig.

See also 
 1969 in Australian literature

References

1969 Australian novels
Hodder & Stoughton books